Cyrtodactylus intermedius, also known as intermediate bow-fingered gecko or Cardamon forest gecko, is a species of gecko found in Cambodia, Vietnam, and Thailand, including several national parks (Khao Yai National Park, Khao Khitchakut National Park, Khao Soi Dao Wildlife Sanctuary and Mu Ko Chang National Park).

References

External links
 Flickr photo by Michael Cota
 Flickr photo by Michael Cota
 Flickr photo by Kevin Messenger

Cyrtodactylus
Reptiles of Cambodia
Reptiles of Thailand
Reptiles of Vietnam
Reptiles described in 1917